In enzymology, a flavonol-3-O-beta-glucoside O-malonyltransferase is an enzyme that catalyzes the chemical reaction

malonyl-CoA + flavonol 3-O-beta-D-glucoside  CoA + flavonol 3-O-(6-O-malonyl-beta-D-glucoside)

Thus, the two substrates of this enzyme are malonyl-CoA and flavonol 3-O-beta-D-glucoside, whereas its two products are CoA and flavonol 3-O-(6-O-malonyl-beta-D-glucoside).

This enzyme belongs to the family of transferases, specifically those acyltransferases transferring groups other than aminoacyl groups.  The systematic name of this enzyme class is malonyl-CoA:flavonol-3-O-beta-D-glucoside 6"-O-malonyltransferase. Other names in common use include flavonol 3-O-glucoside malonyltransferase, MAT-3, and malonyl-coenzyme A:flavonol-3-O-glucoside malonyltransferase.

References

 

EC 2.3.1
Enzymes of unknown structure